Ronald Allan Carter  (4 May 1947 – 12 September 2018) was a British linguist.

A native of Leeds, Carter studied English, Russian, and German, as well as comparative literature, at University of Birmingham. He began teaching at the University of Nottingham after completing a doctorate in 1979. Carter was a founding member of the Poetics and Linguistics Association, and later led the group as chairman. He was elected fellow of the Royal Society of Arts in 1995, and granted an equivalent honor by the Academy of Social Sciences in 2002. In 2009, Carter was named a Member of the Order of the British Empire.

Carter died on 12 September 2018 at the age of 71.

References

1947 births
2018 deaths
20th-century English male writers
21st-century English male writers
20th-century linguists
21st-century linguists
Linguists from the United Kingdom
Alumni of the University of Birmingham
Academics of the University of Nottingham
Writers from Leeds
Fellows of the Academy of Social Sciences
Members of the Order of the British Empire